Moradabad railway division is one of the five railway divisions under Northern Railway zone ( NR ) of Indian Railways. This railway division was formalised in 1899 and its headquarter is located at Moradabad in the state of Uttar Pradesh.

Delhi railway division, Firozpur railway division, Lucknow NR railway division and Ambala railway division are the other railway divisions under NR Zone headquartered at New Delhi.

List of railway stations and towns 
The list includes the stations under the Moradabad railway division and their station category. 

Stations closed for Passengers -

References

 
Divisions of Indian Railways
1952 establishments in Uttar Pradesh